This article lists the squads for the 2020 Pinatar Cup, the inaugural edition of the Pinatar Cup. The cup consisted of a series of friendly games, and was held in Spain from 4 to 10 March 2020. The four national teams involved in the tournament registered a squad of 23 players.

The age listed for each player is on 4 March 2020, the first day of the tournament. The numbers of caps and goals listed for each player do not include any matches played after the start of tournament. The club listed is the club for which the player last played a competitive match prior to the tournament. The nationality for each club reflects the national association (not the league) to which the club is affiliated. A flag is included for coaches that are of a different nationality than their own national team.

Squads

Iceland
Coach: Jón Þór Hauksson

The squad was announced on 13 February 2020. Milan-based Berglind Björg Þorvaldsdóttir withdrew from the squad due to coronavirus fears and was replaced by Sandra Jessen on 27 February 2020. Alexandra Jóhannsdóttir withdrew from the squad with injury and was replaced by Hildur Antonsdóttir on 28 February 2020.

Northern Ireland
Coach: Kenny Shiels

The squad was announced on 22 February 2020.

Scotland
Coach: Shelley Kerr

The squad was announced on 18 February 2020. Nicola Docherty and Amy Muir replaced Chloe Arthur and Jen Beattie on 29 February 2020.

Ukraine
Coach: Natalya Zinchenko

The squad was announced on 25 February 2020.

Player representation

By club
Clubs with three or more players represented are listed.

By club nationality

By club federation

By representatives of domestic league

References

Pinatar Cup